Mamoru Oshii is a prolific Japanese film director, television director, and writer.  In a career that has so far spanned more than forty years, Oshii has been involved in directing OVAs, feature films, short films, television series, and radio dramas.  His first occupation in the anime industry was as a storyboard artist, and in the 1970s he storyboarded a variety of anime television programs for Tatsunoko Productions.  As a writer, Oshii is a frequent screenwriter, and an occasional novelist and manga artist.

Though primarily known as a director of animated films, mostly for Production I.G, Oshii has also been involved in several live-action projects.

Anime

Film

Other credits

Television

Storyboard artist

Other credits

OVA

Live-action

Film

Other credits

Television

Radio drama

Manga

Novel

Music video

Video game

References

General 
 Ruh, Brian (2004). Stray Dog of Anime: The Films of Mamoru Oshii. Palgrave Macmillan. 
 
 
  Production I.G

Specific 

Oshii